Rovello is a historic house in the Sydney suburb of Bellevue Hill, New South Wales, Australia. The house was listed on the now defunct Register of the National Estate on 21 October 1980.

History and description
This two-storey house was designed by Wilson, Neave and Berry. Built in 1936, it is younger than other houses in the area, such as Rona, Ginahgulla, and Caerleon. It was designed around a courtyard modelled on the colonnaded Roman atriums. Features include a two-storey hall and a prominent set of timber stairs.

The Australian Heritage Commission describes Rovello as "Probably Wilson, Neave and Berry's finest extant piece of architecture. It is also an important element in Ginahgulla Road, grouping with No. 14 and with Rona, Ginahgulla and Trahlee to be an outstanding streetscape."

References

Houses in Bellevue Hill, New South Wales
New South Wales places listed on the defunct Register of the National Estate
Houses completed in 1936
1936 establishments in Australia